The SQX-Archiver is an open and free data compression and archival format. It can be used in one's own applications free of charge (license  and royalty free). The homepage provides an SDK, with source and compiled DLLs which are likewise unencumbered by license costs.

The format was designed by Speedproject for Squeez and it is also supported by TUGZip.

The main advantages of SQX format are 
Main compressor is an LZH variant supporting LZ dictionaries from 32K up to 4096K 
Ultra compression mode with dictionary up to 32768K 
Several compressor extensions to handle multimedia data 
High-speed audio (WAV) compressor 
Special compressor stage for IA32 executables 
Solid and non-solid archives support 
Strong 128/256-bit AES encryption (Rijndael) for file data 
Independent encryption of archive directories 
Internal and external data recovery records 
Full support for 64-bit file systems (the size of archives and archive volumes is limited only by the OS) 
Support for digitally signed archives (envelope up to 512 bit, encrypted with 2 * 1024 bit) 
SFX modules for DOS (32-bit protected mode), Win32 and x64. All SFX modules support multi-volume archives
Archive and file comments

External links

 

Windows compression software
Archive formats